Damon Sheehy-Guiseppi (born February 15, 1995) is an American football wide receiver and kick returner who is currently a free agent. He played college football at Phoenix College.

Early life
After growing up in Lake Havasu City, Arizona and attending Lake Havasu High School for two years, Sheehy-Guiseppi moved to Traverse City, Michigan and attended St. Francis High School.

College career
Sheehy-Guiseppi first attended Mesa Community College, where he ran track, before transferring to Phoenix College and joining the football team. There, Sheehy-Guiseppi was named a first-team NJCAA All-American in 2016, after leading the nation in kick return yardage and touchdowns.

Professional career

Cleveland Browns
After being out of football for two years and not having played since 2016, Sheehy-Guiseppi was jobless and homeless, sleeping outside of a gym in Miami, Florida. After receiving a tip about the location of the Cleveland Browns free agent workout, he decided to take his chances to try out for the team, despite not receiving an invitation. By Sheehy-Guiseppi's own admission, he was only allowed at the workout by claiming to know Cleveland Browns Vice President of Player Personnel Alonzo Highsmith, and he impressed Highsmith enough to be invited to another tryout for the Browns a week later. The Browns officially signed him on April 5, 2019. During the team's OTAs, he competed for the kick returner position with Antonio Callaway, Dontrell Hilliard and D'Ernest Johnson.

In Cleveland's first preseason game of the 2019 NFL season against the Washington Redskins, Sheehy-Guiseppi returned a punt 86 yards for a touchdown. On August 31, he was waived by the Browns.

Then in 2020, he was signed by the Buffalo Bills and after another preseason punt return, he was added to the practice squad, and later waived

New York Guardians
On November 22, 2019, Sheehy-Guiseppi was drafted by the New York Guardians in the XFL Supplemental Draft. He was placed on injured reserve on January 8, 2020. He was waived from injured reserve on March 12, 2020.

The Spring League
Sheehy-Guiseppi was selected by the Alphas of The Spring League during its player selection draft on October 10, 2020.

References

External links
Cleveland Browns bio

1995 births
Living people
American football return specialists
American football wide receivers
Canadian football return specialists
Canadian football wide receivers
Cleveland Browns players
Fan Controlled Football players
New York Guardians players
Ottawa Redblacks players
People from Lake Havasu City, Arizona
Phoenix Bears football players
Players of American football from Arizona
Players of American football from Michigan
Players of American football from Orlando, Florida
Players of Canadian football from Orlando, Florida
Sportspeople from Traverse City, Michigan
The Spring League players